Nicolaj Ritter (born 8 May 1992) is a Danish footballer, who plays as a left-back for FC Fredericia.

Club career

Silkeborg IF
On 17 May 2011 it was confirmed, that Ritter had joined Silkeborg IF on a 2-year deal.

He started playing a year with the U19 team, but already in the first match of the season, Ritter got his debut against his former club FC Midtjylland on 17 July 2011, where he replaces Christian Holst in the 76' minut.

On 17 May 2013, Ritter got renewed his contract until the summer 2014.

SønderjyskE
On 8 June 2016 it was confirmed, that Ritter had signed a two-year contract with SønderjyskE.

Vejle Boldklub
On 31 January 2018, Ritter signed for Vejle Boldklub, after getting his contract with SønderjyskE terminated. After only a half season, Vejle announced, that Ritter alongside two teammates would leave the club at the end of the season.

FC Fredericia
On 5 July 2018, Ritter signed for FC Fredericia.

References

External links
 
 Nicolaj Ritter on DBU

1992 births
Living people
Danish men's footballers
Danish Superliga players
Danish 1st Division players
Silkeborg IF players
SønderjyskE Fodbold players
Vejle Boldklub players
FC Fredericia players
Denmark youth international footballers
Association football defenders
People from Jammerbugt Municipality
Sportspeople from the North Jutland Region